The 2013 Feed the Children 300 was the 15th stock car race of the 2013 NASCAR Nationwide Series and the 13th iteration of the event. The race was held on Friday, June 28, 2013, in Sparta, Kentucky, at Kentucky Speedway, a 1.5-mile (2.41 km) tri-oval speedway. The race was shortened from its scheduled 200 laps to 170 due to rain cutting the race short. At race's end, Brad Keselowski, driving for Penske Racing would lead the last 15 laps of the race to win his 22nd career NASCAR Nationwide Series win and his second win of the season. To fill out the podium, Elliott Sadler of Joe Gibbs Racing and Matt Crafton of Richard Childress Racing would finish second and third, respectively.

Background 

Kentucky Speedway is a 1.5-mile (2.4 km) tri-oval speedway in Sparta, Kentucky, which has hosted ARCA, NASCAR and Indy Racing League racing annually since it opened in 2000. The track is currently owned and operated by Speedway Motorsports, Inc. and Jerry Carroll, who, along with four other investors, owned Kentucky Speedway until 2008. The speedway has a grandstand capacity of 117,000. Construction of the speedway began in 1998 and was completed in mid-2000. The speedway has hosted the Gander RV & Outdoors Truck Series, Xfinity Series, IndyCar Series, Indy Lights, and most recently, the NASCAR Cup Series beginning in 2011.

Entry list 

 (R) denotes rookie driver.
 (i) denotes driver who is ineligible for series driver points.

Practice

First practice 
The first practice session was held on Thursday, June 27, at 6:30 PM EST, and would last for 45 minutes.

Second and final practice 
The second and final practice session, sometimes referred to as Happy Hour, was held on Friday, June 28, at 9:00 AM EST, and would last for one hour and 30 minutes.

Qualifying 
Qualifying was held on Friday, June 28, at 3:35 PM EST. Each driver would have two laps to set a fastest time; the fastest of the two would count as their official qualifying lap.

Dexter Stacey would be the only driver to fail to qualify.

Full qualifying results

Race results

References 

2013 NASCAR Nationwide Series
NASCAR races at Kentucky Speedway
June 2013 sports events in the United States
2013 in sports in Kentucky